Randy Gilhen (born June 13, 1963) is a German-born Canadian former ice hockey forward. Gilhen played 457 games in the National Hockey League (NHL). As a member of the 1991 Pittsburgh Penguins, Gilhen was the first German-born player to win the Stanley Cup.

Playing career

Gilhen started his National Hockey League career with the Hartford Whalers in 1982. He also played for the Winnipeg Jets, Pittsburgh Penguins, Los Angeles Kings, New York Rangers, Tampa Bay Lightning, and Florida Panthers.  His last NHL season was the 1996 season, after which he played two seasons with the Manitoba Moose before retiring in 1998.

Personal life

Born in Zweibrücken, West Germany, Gilhen grew up in Winnipeg, Manitoba.

Career statistics

Awards and achievements 
Stanley Cup Championship (1991)
"Honoured Member" of the Manitoba Hockey Hall of Fame

References

External links 
 

1963 births
Florida Panthers players
Hartford Whalers draft picks
Hartford Whalers players
Living people
Los Angeles Kings players
Manitoba Moose (IHL) players
New York Rangers players
Pittsburgh Penguins players
Saskatoon Blades players
Ice hockey people from Winnipeg
Stanley Cup champions
Tampa Bay Lightning players
West German ice hockey left wingers
Winnipeg Jets (1979–1996) players
Winnipeg Warriors (1980–1984) players
West German emigrants to Canada
Canadian ice hockey left wingers